The 1996 Pan American Men's Handball Championship was the seventh edition of the tournament, held in Colorado Springs, United States from 8 to 13 October 1996. It acted as the American qualifying tournament for the 1997 World Championship, where the top three placed team qualied.

Preliminary round
All times are local (UTC−7).

Group A

Group B

Knockout stage

Bracket

Fifth place bracket

5–8th place semifinals

Semifinals

Seventh place game

Fifth place game

Third place game

Final

Final ranking

The United States withdrew and Brazil replaced them.

External links
Results on todor66.com

Pan American Men's Handball Championship
Pan American Men's Handball Championship
Pan American Men's Handball Championship
International handball competitions hosted by the United States
Pan American Men's Handball Championship